The following is a list of productions at the Mark Taper Forum in Los Angeles, California.

1960s

1967 (Premiere Season)
The Devils (West Coast Premiere)
Written by John Whiting; Director by Gordon Davidson

The Sorrows of Frederick (World Premiere)
Written by Romulus Linney; Directed by Albert Marre

The Marriage of Mr. Mississippi (West Coast Premiere)
Written by Friederich Dürrenmatt; Directed by Malcolm Black

Who's Happy Now (World Premiere)
Written by Oliver Hailey; Directed by Gordon Davidson

Muzeeka by John Guare (World Premiere); Directed by Edward Parone.

1968
The Miser by Molière; Directed by Douglas Campbell.

In the Matter of J. Robert Oppenheimer by Heinar Kipphardt (American Premiere); Directed by Gordon Davidson
	
Camino Real by Tennessee Williams; Directed by Milton Katselas

The Golden Fleece by A. R. Gurney, Jr. (World Premiere); Directed by Jered Barclay

1969
The House of Atreus by Aeschylus; Directed by Tyrone Guthrie

in repertory with:

The Resistible Rise of Arturo Ui by Bertolt Brecht; Directed by Edward Payson Call

The Adventures of the Black Girl in Her Search For God by Bernard Shaw (World Premiere)
Adapted for the stage by Christopher Isherwood; Directed by Lamont Johnson

Chemin de Fer by Georges Feydeau (American Premiere); Directed by Stephen Porter

Uncle Vanya by Anton Chekhov; Directed by Harold Clurman

1970s

1970
Murderous Angels by Conor Cruise O’Brien (World Premiere); Directed by Gordon Davidson

Crystal & Fox by Brian Friel (American Premiere); Directed by Hilton Edwards         	

Paul Sills’ Story Theatre devised and directed by Paul Sills

The Dream on Monkey Mountain (World Premiere) by Derek Walcott; Directed by Michael A. Schultz

Rosebloom (World Premiere) by Harvey Perr; Directed by Gordon Davidson

1971
Metamorphoses (World Premiere) by Ovid, adapted by Paul Sills and Arnold Weinstein; Directed by Paul Sills

Othello by William Shakespeare; Directed by John Berry

The Trial of the Catonsville Nine (World Premiere) by Daniel Berrigan, S.J.; Directed by Gordon Davidson

Major Barbara by Bernard Shaw; Directed by Edward Parone

Godspell (West Coast Premiere) by John-Michael Tebelak and Stephen Schwartz; Directed by John-Michael Tebelak

1972
McKenna/MacGowran (Here Are Ladies by Joyce, Shaw, O’Casey, Yeats, Synge, Stephens, Beckett, etc.; Directed by Sean Kenny and The Works of Beckett by Samuel Beckett; Directed by Jack MacGowran)

Volpone by Ben Jonson;Directed by Edward Parone.

Old Times (West Coast Premiere) by Harold Pinter; Directed by Jeff Bleckner
	
Don't Bother Me, I Can't Cope (West Coast Premiere) by Micki Grant; Conceived and directed by Vinnette Carroll.

Henry IV, Part I by William Shakespeare; Directed by Gordon Davidson

1973
Mass (West Coast Premiere) by Leonard Bernstein; Directed by Gordon Davidson.

The Mind with the Dirty Man (World Premiere) by Jules Tasca; Directed by Edward Parone.

Forget-Me-Not Lane (West Coast Premiere) by Peter Nichols; Directed by Arvin Brown.

The Hot l Baltimore 	(West Coast Premiere) by Lanford Wilson; Directed by Marshall W. Mason.

Brecht: Sacred & Profane (West Coast Premiere) (The Mahagonny Songplay by Bertolt Brecht, music by Kurt Weill, and The Measures Taken by Bertolt Brecht Music by Hanns Eisler); Directed by Edward Payson Call

1974/1975
Hamlet by William Shakespeare; Directed by Gordon Davidson

The Charlatan (World Premiere) by Derek Walcott; Music by Galt MacDermot; Directed by Mel Shapiro
	
Savages (American Premiere) by Christopher Hampton; Directed by Gordon Davidson

Juno and the Paycock by Seán O'Casey; Directed by George Seaton

1975 Special Spring Celebration
Me and Bessie (World Premiere) Book by Will Holt; Concept by Linda Hopkins; Directed by Robert Greenwald  		

Sizwe Banzi is Dead and The Island (West Coast Premiere) by Athol Fugard, Winston Ntshona and John Kani; Directed by Athol Fugard

1975/1976
Once in a Lifetime by George S. Kaufman and Moss Hart; Directed by Edward Parone

Too Much Johnson (World Premiere) by William Gillette; Directed by Gordon Davidson

in repertory with

The Shadow Box by Michael Cristofer; Directed by Gordon Davidson

The Duchess of Malfi (West Coast Premiere) by John Webster; Directed by Howard Sackler

Four Plays in Repertory:

Ashes (American Premiere) by David Rudkin; Directed by Edward Parone       	

Cross Country (World Premiere) by Susan Miller; Directed by Vickie Rue                     	

And Where She Stops Nobody Knows (World Premiere) by Oliver Hailey; Directed by Gordon Davidson.

Three Sisters by Anton Chekhov; Directed by Edward Parone

1976/1977
The Robber Bridegroom (West Coast Premiere) Book and lyrics by Alfred Uhry; Music by Robert Waldman; Directed by Gerald Freedman

Ice (World Premiere) by Michael Cristofer; Directed by Jeff Bleckner
	
Vanities (West Coast Premiere) by Jack Heifner; Directed by Garland Wright
	
Travesties (West Coast Premiere) by Tom Stoppard; Directed by Edward Parone

in repertory with

The Importance of Being Earnest by Oscar Wilde; Directed by Edward Parone.

10th Anniversary Repertory Festival
A History of the American Film (West Coast Premiere) by Christopher Durang; Directed by Peter Mark Schifter.
	
Angel City by Sam Shepard; Directed by Robert Calhoun

Leander Stillwell (World Premiere) by David Rush; Directed by John Dennis.  	

Bugs/Guns by Doris Baizley; Music by Harry Aguado; Directed by John Dennis

1977/1978
for colored girls who have considered suicide/when the rainbow is enuf (West Coast Premiere) by Ntozake Shangé; Directed by Oz Scott

Comedians (West Coast Premiere) by Trevor Griffiths; Directed by Edward Parone.

Getting Out (West Coast Premiere) by Marsha Norman; Directed by Gordon Davidson

Black Angel by Michael Cristofer; Directed by Gordon Davidson

1978/1979
Zoot Suit (World Premiere) by Luis Valdez; Directed by Luis Valdez

Dusa, Fish, Stas & Vi (American Premiere) by Pam Gems; Directed by Edward Parone

Terra Nova (West Coast Premiere) by Ted Tally; Directed by Gordon Davidson                       	

The Tempest by William Shakespeare; Directed by John Hirsch

1979/1980
Talley's Folly (West Coast Premiere) by Lanford Wilson; Directed by Marshall W. Mason; in repertory with

5th of July by Lanford Wilson; Directed by Marshall W. Mason

Children of a Lesser God (World Premiere) by Mark Medoff; Directed by Gordon Davidson

I Ought To Be In Pictures (World Premiere) by Neil Simon; Directed by Herbert Ross

Says I, Says He (West Coast Premiere) by Ron Hutchinson; Directed by Steven Robman

Division Street (World Premiere) by Steve Tesich; Directed by Tom Moore

1980s

1980/1981
The Lady and the Clarinet (World Premiere) by Michael Cristofer; Directed by Gordon Davidson

Billy Bishop Goes To War (West Coast Premiere) by John Gray in collaboration with Eric Peterson; Directed by John Gray 
	
Hoagy, Bix and Wolfgang Beethoven Bunkhaus (American Premiere) by Adrian Mitchell; Directed by Steven Robman	

Tintypes (West Coast Premiere) by Mary Kyte with Mel Marvin and Gary Pearle; Directed by Gary Pearle

Chekhov in Yalta (World Premiere) by John Driver and Jeffrey Haddow; Directed Ellis Rabb and Gordon Davidson in repertory with

Twelfth Night by William Shakespeare; Directed by Ellis Rabb and Diana Maddox

1981/1982
A Lesson From Aloes (West Coast Premiere) by Athol Fugard; Directed by Daniel Petrie.

A Tale Told (West Coast Premiere) by Lanford Wilson; Directed by Marshall W. Mason

Number Our Days (World Premiere) by Suzanne Grossmann; Based on the book by Barbara Myerhoff; Conceived and directed by John Hirsch

Tales From Hollywood (World Premiere) by Christopher Hampton; Directed by Gordon Davidson

A Flea in Her Ear by Georges Feydeau A new adaptation by Suzanne Grossmann and Paxton Whitehead; Directed by Tom Moore in repertory with

The Misanthrope by Molière; English verse translation by Richard Wilbur; Directed by Diana Maddox

1982/1983
A Soldier's Play (West Coast Premiere) by Charles Fuller; Directed by Douglas Turner Ward

Metamorphosis (American Premiere) by Franz Kafka; Adapted and directed by Steven Berkoff

Accidental Death of an Anarchist (West Coast Premiere) by Dario Fo; Adapted by 	John Lahr; Directed by Mel Shapiro
	
Grown Ups (West Coast Premiere) by Jules Feiffer; Directed by John Madden

A Month in the Country by Ivan Turgenev; Adapted by Willis Bell; Directed by Tom Moore; in repertory with

Richard III by William Shakespeare; Directed by Diana Maddox

1983/1984
Cat on a Hot Tin Roof by Tennessee Williams; Directed by José Quintero

An American Comedy (World Premiere) by Richard Nelson; Directed by John Madden

Quilters (West Coast Premiere) by Molly Newman and Barbara Damashek; Music, lyrics and entire production directed by Barbara Damashek.
 
The Genius (American Premiere) by Howard Brenton; Directed by Ben Levit		

Three plays in repertory:

The American Clock: A Mural for the Theatre (West Coast Premiere) a new version by Arthur Miller; Directed by Gordon Davidson

Wild Oats: A Romance of the Old West (World Premiere) newly adapted from John O’Keeffe’s play by James McLure; Directed by Tom Moore

Moby Dick—Rehearsed by Orson Welles; Directed by Edward Payson Call

1984/1985
Viva Vittorio! (American Premiere) conceived and directed by Vittorio Gassman

The Hands of Its Enemy (World Premiere) by Mark Medoff; Directed by Gordon Davidson

Passion Play (West Coast Premiere) by Peter Nichols; Directed by Gwen Arner	

Traveler in the Dark (West Coast Premiere) by Marsha Norman; Directed by Gordon Davidson

In the Belly of the Beast by Jack Henry Abbott; Adapted by Adrian Hall; Further adapted by
Robert Woodruff; 	Directed by Robert Woodruff

Undiscovered Country (West Coast Premiere) by Arthur Schnitzler in a version by Tom Stoppard; Directed by Ken Ruta in repertory with

Measure for Measure by William Shakespeare; Directed by Robert Egan

1985/1986
The Beautiful Lady (West Coast Premiere) by Elizabeth Swados and Paul Schmidt; Music, lyrics and direction by Elizabeth Swados.

Romance Language (West Coast Premiere) by Peter Parnell; Directed by Sheldon Larry

'night, Mother by Marsha Norman; Directed by Tom Moore

Three plays in repertory:

Green Card (World Premiere) written and directed by JoAnne Akalaitis

The Real Thing by Tom Stoppard; Directed by Gordon Davidson

Hedda Gabler by Henrik Ibsen in a version by Christopher Hampton; Directed by Robert Egan

1986/1987
Asinamali! (Special Event) written and directed by Mbongeni Ngema

The Immigrant—A Hamilton County Album (West Coast Premiere) by Mark Harelik; Directed by Randal Myler

Ghetto (English Language Premiere) by Joshua Sobol; Directed by Gordon Davidson
	
Burn This (World Premiere) by Lanford Wilson; Directed by Marshall W. Mason

The Traveler (World Premiere) by Jean-Claude van Itallie; Directed by Steven Kent

Roza (West Coast Premiere) book and lyrics by Julian More; Music by Gilbert Becaud; based on “La Vie Devant Soi” by Romain Gary; Directed by Harold Prince

Loot by Joe Orton; Directed by John Tillinger; in repertory with

Entertaining Mr. Sloane by Joe Orton; Directed by John Tillinger

1987/1988
Babbitt: a marriage (World Premiere) Based on the novel by Sinclair Lewis; Adapted by Ron Hutchinson; Music composed and adapted by Mel Marvin; Directed by Steven Robman.

Hunting Cockroaches (West Coast Premiere) by Janusz Glowacki; Directed by Arthur Penn
 
A Lie of the Mind by Sam Shepard; Directed by Robert Woodruff

Made in Bangkok (American Premiere) by Anthony Minghella; Directed by Robert Egan

The Colored Museum by George C. Wolfe; Directed by L. Kenneth Richardson

Lost Highway: The Music and Legend of Hank Williams (West Coast Premiere) by Randal Myler and Mark Harelik; Directed by Randal Myler

1988/1989
Nothing Sacred (United States Premiere) by George F. Walker Based on the novel Fathers Sons by Ivan Turgenev; Directed by Michael Lindsay-Hogg

Frankie and Johnny in the Clair de Lune (West Coast Premiere) by Terrence McNally; Directed by Paul Benedict

Dutch Landscape (World Premiere) by Jon Robin Baitz; Directed by Gordon Davidson

Sansei (World Premiere) created by Hiroshima; Developed and directed by Robert Egan.

Stand-Up Tragedy (World Premiere) by Bill Cain; Directed by Ron Link

Temptation (West Coast Premiere) by Václav Havel; Directed by Richard Jordan

1989/1990
Our Country’s Good (American Premiere) by Timberlake Wertenbaker; Based on the novel The Playmaker by Thomas Keneally; Co-directed by Max Stafford-Clark and Les Waters

Mystery of the Rose Bouquet (American Premiere) by Manuel Puig; Translated by Allan Baker; American adaptation by Jeremy Lawrence; Directed by Robert Allan Ackerman

A Midsummer Night’s Dream by William Shakespeare; Directed by Kenneth Branagh; in repertory with

King Lear by William Shakespeare; Directed by Kenneth Branagh (The American debut of The
Renaissance Theatre Company’s productions

50/60 Vision: Plays and Playwrights That Changed The Theatre (Thirteen 
Plays in Repertory); Conceived and produced by Edward Parone; Plays by Edward Albee, Amiri Baraka (LeRoi
Jones), Samuel Beckett, Jean Genet, Eugène Ionesco, Harold Pinter and Sam Shepard; Directed by Michael Arabian, Peter C. Brosius, Daniel O’Connor, Carey Perloff and Ethan Silverman

Aristocrats (West Coast Premiere) by Brian Friel; Directed by Robert Egan
	
Miss Evers' Boys (West Coast Premiere) by David Feldshuh; Directed by Irene Lewis

1990s

1990/1991
Hope of the Heart (World Premiere) by Adrian Hall; Adapted from the writings of Robert Penn Warren; Directed by Adrian Hall.

The Dragon’s Trilogy by Marie Brassard, Jean Casault, Lorraine Côté, Marie Gignac, Robert Lepage, Marie Michaud; directed by Robert Lepage (Special Event - Los Angeles Festival, Macgowan Hall, UCLA)

The Lisbon Traviata (West Coast Premiere)by Terrence McNally; Directed by John Tillinger

The Wash by Philip Kan Gotanda; Directed by Sharon Ott

Jelly's Last Jam (World Premiere)book by George C. Wolfe, Music by Jelly Roll Morton, Musical 
Adaptation and Additional Composition by Luther Henderson, Lyrics by Susan Birkenhead; Directed by 
George C. Wolfe

Julius Caesar by William Shakespeare; Directed by Oskar Eustis

The Fever written and performed by Wallace Shawn at MOCA’s Ahmanson
Auditorium (Special Event)
May 21-June 1, 1991

Sex, Drugs, Rock & Roll written and performed by Eric Bogosian; Directed by Jo Bonney (Special Event)

Widows (World Premiere) based on the novel by Ariel Dorfman; Adapted for the stage by Ariel Dorfman and Tony Kushner; Directed by Robert Egan

Chola Con Cello: A Homegirl In The Philharmonic written and performed by María Elena Gaitán, the first staged version of a conceptual performance on immigrant human rights. Directed by Diane Rodriguez, produced by Josephine Ramirez. Performed as part of the Taper's OUT IN FRONT post Rodney King Riot performances.

1991/1992
Spunk (West Coast Premiere) by Zora Neale Hurston; Adapted and directed by George C. Wolfe; Music by Chic Street Man

Henceforward... (West Coast Premiere) by Alan Ayckbourn; Directed by Tom Moore
 
The Kentucky Cycle by Robert Schenkkan; Directed by Warner Shook

Richard II by William Shakespeare; Directed by Robert Egan

Unfinished Stories (World Premiere) by Sybille Pearson; Directed by Gordon Davidson	

Fire in the Rain...Singer in the Storm written and performed by Holly Near; Conceived and developed by Timothy Near and Holly Near; Directed by Timothy Near

1992/1993
Angels in America: A Gay Fantasia on National Themes, Part One – Millennium Approaches by Tony Kushner; Directed by Oskar Eustis with Tony Taccone

Angels in America: A Gay Fantasia on National Themes, Part Two – Perestroika (World Premiere) by Tony Kushner; Directed by Oskar Eustis with Tony Taccone

The Substance of Fire by Jon Robin Baitz; Directed by Daniel Sullivan.

Scenes from an Execution (American Premiere) by Howard Barker; Directed by Robert Allan Ackerman

Twilight: Los Angeles, 1992 On the Road: A Search for American Character (World Premiere) conceived, written and performed by Anna Deavere Smith; Directed by Emily Mann

Lips Together, Teeth Apart by Terrence McNally; Directed by John Tillinger

1993/1994

Fall Festival:

The Persians by Aeschylus;  A Modern Version by Robert Auletta (American Premiere); 
Music composed and performed by Hamza El Din; Directed by Peter Sellars
 
Pounding Nails in the Floor With My Forehead written and performed by Eric Bogosian; Directed by Jo Bonney

Carpa Clash written and performed by Culture Clash—Richard Montoya, Ric Salinas and Herbert Siguenza; Directed by Jose Luis Valenzuela with

Mimi’s Monologue written and performed by Marga Gomez; Directed by Jose Luis Valenzuela

Subscription Season:

Death and the Maiden by Ariel Dorfman; Directed by Robert Egan

The Wood Demon by Anton Chekhov; in a world premiere translation by Nicholas Saunders and Frank Dwyer; Directed by Frank Dwyer

Bandido! (World Premiere) by Luis Valdez; Music by Lalo Schifrin; Lyrics by Luis Valdez; Directed by Jose Luis Valenzuela

The Waiting Room (World Premiere) by Lisa Loomer; Directed by David Schweizer

1994/1995
Floating Islands, Part One - The Family Business: The Modern Ladies of Guanabacoa and In the Eye of the Hurricane (World Premiere) by Eduardo Machado; Directed by Oskar Eustis

Floating Islands, Part Two - After the Revolution 
Fabiola and Broken Eggs (World Premiere) by Eduardo Machado; Directed by Oskar Eustis

Black Elk Speaks (West Coast Premiere) adapted by Christopher Sergel. Based on the book by John G. Neihardt; Directed by Donovan Marley

Three Hotels by Jon Robin Baitz; Directed by Joe Mantello

Master Class (West Coast Premiere) by Terrence McNally; Directed by Leonard Foglia

Hysteria (American Premiere) by Terry Johnson; Directed by Phyllida Lloyd

1995/1996
Slavs! (West Coast Premiere Production) by Tony Kushner; Directed by Michael Greif
	
The Family Business (West Coast Premiere) written, directed and choreographed by Ain Gordon and David Gordon
	
Edward Albee’s Three Tall Women; Directed by Lawrence Sacharow

Blade to the Heat (West Coast Premiere) by Oliver Mayer; Directed by Ron Link
	
Psychopathia Sexualis by John Patrick Shanley; Directed by Daniel Sullivan

Changes of Heart by Pierre Carlet de Chamblain de Marivaux;  Translated, adapted and directed by Stephen Wadsworth

1996/1997
Having Our Say by Emily Mann; Adapted from the book by Sarah L. Delany and A. Elizabeth Delany with Amy Hill Hearth; Directed by Walter Dallas

Molly Sweeney by Brian Friel; Directed by Gwen Arner

Arcadia by Tom Stoppard; Directed by Robert Egan

Valley Song written and directed by Athol Fugard

New Theatre For Now on the Mainstage, A 30th Anniversary Festival:

Demonology (West Coast Premiere) by Kelly Stuart; Directed by David Schweizer

The Joy of Going Somewhere Definite (West Coast Premiere)by Quincy Long; Directed by 
David Schweizer			

The Street of the Sun (World Premiere) by José Rivera; Directed by David Esbjornson

Mules (American Premiere) by Winsome Pinnock; Directed by Lisa Peterson

Nine Armenians by Leslie Ayvazian; Directed by Gordon Davidson

1997/1998
Skylight (West Coast Premiere) by David Hare; Directed by Robert Egan
	
Room Service by John Murray and Allen Boretz; Adapted and performed by The Flying Karamazov Brothers with Paul Magid and Robert Woodruff;  Directed by Robert Woodruff

Neat written and performed by Charlayne Woodard; Directed by Daniel Sullivan

Gross Indecency: The Three Trials of Oscar Wilde written and directed by Moisés Kaufman

Dealer’s Choice (West Coast Premiere) by Patrick Marber; Directed by Robert Egan

The Cider House Rules: A new play in two parts Adapted by Peter Parnell from the
novel by John Irving; Conceived and directed by Tom Hulce and Jane Jones

1998-1999
Putting It Together: A Musical Review Music and Lyrics by Stephen Sondheim; Directed by Eric D. Shaeffer; Musical Staging by Bob Avian; Presented in association with Cameron Mackintosh
 Starring John Barrowman, Carol Burnett, Susan Egan, John McCook and Bronson Pinchot

Tongue of a Bird by Ellen McLaughlin; Directed by Lisa Peterson; A co-production with Joseph Papp’s Public Theater
 Starring Cherry Jones, Ashley Johnson, Marian Seldes, Sharon Lawrence and Diane Venora

How I Learned to Drive by Paula Vogel; Directed by Mark Brokaw
 Starring Molly Ringwald and Brian Kerwin

House Arrest: An Introgression (Special Event) A work in progress written and directed by Anna Deavere Smith

Enigma Variations (American Premiere) by Eric-Emmanuel Schmitt; Translated by Roeg Jacob; Directed by Daniel Roussel
	
Hughie by Eugene O’Neill; Directed by Al Pacino
 Starring Al Pacino and Paul Benedict

The First Picture Show (World Premiere Production) by Ain Gordon and David Gordon; Music by Jeanine Tesori; Directed by David Gordon; Presented in association with American Conservatory Theater.

1999/2000
Space (West Coast Premiere) written and directed by Tina Landau
	
Neil Simon’s The Dinner Party (World Premiere); Directed by John Rando
	
August Wilson’s Jitney (West Coast Premiere) Directed by Marion McClinton
		
Metamorphoses A new play based on the myths of Ovid; Written and directed by Mary Zimmerman

The Poison Tree (World Premiere) by Robert Glaudini; Directed by Robert Egan

Expecting Isabel (West Coast Premiere) by Lisa Loomer; Directed by Douglas C. Wager

2000s

2000/2001
August Wilson’s King Hedley II Directed by Marion McClinton.
	
Closer by Patrick Marber; Directed by Robert Egan

Glimmer, Glimmer and Shine (West Coast Premiere) by Warren Leight; Directed by Evan Yionoulis.

QED (World Premiere) A New Play by Peter Parnell; Inspired by writings of Richard Feynman and Ralph Leighton’s “Tuva or Bust!"; Directed by Gordon Davidson
	
The Body of Bourne (World Premiere) by John Belluso; Directed by Lisa Peterson.

In Real Life (World Premiere Production) written and performed by Charlayne Woodard; Directed by Daniel Sullivan.

in repertory with

Another American: Asking and Telling written and performed by Marc Wolf; Directed by Joe Mantello

2001/2002
Flower Drum Song Music by Richard Rodgers; Lyrics by Oscar Hammerstein II; Book by David Henry Hwang; Based on the original by Oscar Hammerstein II and Joseph Fields; Based on the novel by C.Y. Lee; Directed and Choreographed by Robert Longbottom (World Premiere of the Musical’s New Book)

Copenhagen (West Coast Premiere) by Michael Frayn; Directed by Michael Blakemore; By arrangement with Michael Codron, Lee Dean and The Royal National Theatre

My Old Lady (West Coast Premiere) by Israel Horovitz; Directed by David Esbjornson; Presented by CTG/Mark Taper Forum at the James A. Doolittle Theatre; part of Taper subscription series

The Molière Comedies: The School for Husbands and The Imaginary Cuckold
by Molière; Translated by Richard Wilbur; Directed by Brian Bedford

Sorrows and Rejoicings (West Coast Premiere) Written and directed by Athol Fugard

The House of Bernarda Alba (West Coast Premiere) by Federico García Lorca; In a new adaptation by Chay Yew; Directed by Lisa Peterson

2002/2003
Nickel and Dimed (World Premiere Production) by Joan Holden; Based on the book by Barbara Ehrenreich; Directed by Bartlett Sher

Big River Music and Lyrics by Roger Miller; Book by William Hauptman; Adapted from the novel by Mark Twain; Directed and Choreographed by Jeff Calhoun

Living Out (World Premiere) by Lisa Loomer; Directed by Bill Rauch

Ten Unknowns (West Coast Premiere) by Jon Robin Baitz; Directed by Robert Egan

Slanguage (West Coast Premiere) by UNIVERSES; directed by Jo Bonney

Chavez Ravine (World Premiere) Written and performed by Culture Clash; Directed by Lisa Peterson

August Wilson’s Gem of the Ocean (World Premiere Production); Directed by Marion McClinton

2003/2004
Homebody/Kabul by Tony Kushner; Directed by Frank Galati; Presented in association with Steppenwolf Theatre Company

Like Jazz (World Premiere) Music by Cy Coleman; Lyrics by Alan & Marilyn Bergman; Written by Larry Gelbart; Musical Staging and Choreography by Patricia Birch; Directed by Gordon Davidson; Presented in association with Transamerica

Topdog/Underdog by Suzan-Lori Parks; Directed by George C. Wolfe; Presented in association with Seattle Repertory Theatre

The Talking Cure (American Premiere) by Christopher Hampton; Directed by Gordon Davidson

Stones in His Pockets by Marie Jones; Directed by Neel Keller

Intimate Apparel by Lynn Nottage; Directed by Dan Sullivan; Presented in association with Roundabout Theatre Company

2004/2005
Nothing But The Truth (West Coast Premiere) by John Kani; Directed by Janice Honeyman

The School for Scandal by Richard Brisley Sheridan; Directed by Brian Bedford

Edward Albee’s The Goat, or Who is Sylvia?; Directed by Warner Shook

Electricidad (West Coast Premiere) by Luis Alfaro; Based on Sophocles’ “Electra”; Directed by Lisa Peterson

Stuff Happens (American Premiere) by David Hare; Directed by Gordon Davidson

August Wilson’s Radio Golf (World Premiere Production); Directed by Kenny Leon

2005/2006
Romance (West Coast Premiere) by David Mamet; The Atlantic
Theater Company production;Directed by Neil Pepe

Lewis and Clark Reach the Euphrates (World Premiere) by Robert Schenkkan; Directed by Gregory Boyd 
	
The Cherry Orchard by Anton Chekhov; Adapted by Martin Sherman; Directed by Sean Mathias

iWitness (American Premiere) by Joshua Sobol; Adapted by Barry Edelstein from an English Language Version by Joshua Sobol. Directed by Barry Edelstein
	
Without Walls by Alfred Uhry; Directed by Christopher Ashley

Water & Power (World Premiere); Written by Richard Montoya for Culture Clash;  Directed by Lisa Peterson

2006/2007
Doubt by John Patrick Shanley; Directed by Doug Hughes; Presented at the Ahmanson Theatre

Nightingale (American Premiere) Written and performed by Lynn Redgrave; Directed by Joseph Hardy
	
13 (World Premiere) Music and Lyrics by Jason Robert Brown; Book by Dan Elish; Directed by Todd Graff

Distracted (World Premiere) by Lisa Loomer; Directed by Leonard Foglia
	
Yellow Face (World Premiere) by David Henry Hwang; Directed by Leigh Silverman; Presented in association with the Public Theater and East West Players

2007/2008
The History Boys by Alan Bennett; Directed by Paul Miller; Original Direction by Nicholas Hytner; Presented at the Ahmanson Theatre.
	
Sweeney Todd Music and Lyrics by Stephen Sondheim; Book by Hugh Wheeler; From an Adaptation by Christopher Bond; Music Orchestrated by Sarah Travis; Directed and Designed by John Doyle; Presented at the Ahmanson Theatre

The House of Blue Leaves by John Guare; Directed by Nicholas Martin

The School of Night (American Premiere) by Peter Whelan; Directed by Bill Alexander

2009
Pippin Book by Roger O. Hirson; Music and Lyrics by Stephen Schwartz; Directed and Choreographed by Jeff Calhoun; Co-produced with Deaf West Theatre

Lydia by Octavio Solis; Directed by Juliette Carrillo

Oleanna by David Mamet; Directed by Dough Hughes
Starring: Bill Pullman and Julia Stiles

Parade Book by Alfred Uhry; Music and Lyrics by Jason Robert Brown; Directed and choreographed by Rob Ashford Presented in associate with the Donmar Warehouse
Starring: T.R. Knight, Lara Pulver, Charlotte d'Amboise, Christian Hoff, Phoebe Strole

Palestine, New Mexico (World Premiere) by Richard Montoya for Culture Clash; Directed by Lisa Peterson

2010s

2010
The Subject Was Roses by Frank D. Gilroy; Directed by Neil Pepe
Starring Martin Sheen, Frances Conroy and Brian Geraghty

Bengal Tiger at the Baghdad Zoo by Rajiv Joseph; Directed by Moisés Kaufman

The Lieutenant of Inishmore by Martin McDonagh; Directed by Wilson Milam

The Glass Menagerie by Tennessee Williams; Directed by Gordon Edelstein
Starring Judith Ivey

Randy Newman's Harps and Angels Music and Lyrics by Randy Newman; Conceived by Jack Viertel; Musical Staging by Warren Carlyle; Directed by Jerry Zaks

2011
Stories by Heart featuring the works of P.G. Wodehouse and Ring Lardner; Conceived, written and performed by John Lithgow

33 Variations written and directed by Moisés Kaufman
Starring Jane Fonda

Burn This by Lanford Wilson; Directed by Nicholas Martin

Above the Call; Beyond the Duty written and performed by James McEachin; NOTE: This production was not part of the official MTF season.

2012
Clybourne Park by Bruce Norris; Directed by Pam MacKinnon

Waiting for Godot by Samuel Beckett; Directed by Michael Arabian

Los Otros by Ellen Fitzhugh and Michael John LaChiusa; Directed by Graciela Daniele

Red by John Logan; Directed by Michael Grandage

November by David Mamet

Other Desert Cities by Jon Robin Baitz; Directed by Joe Mantello

2013
Tribes by Nina Raine; Directed by David Cromer

Humor Abuse by Lorenzo Pisoni

Joe Turner's Come and Gone by August Wilson; Directed by Phylicia Rashad

A Parallelogram by Bruce Norris; Directed by Anna D. Shapiro

The Steward of Christendom by Sebastian Barry; Directed by Steven Robman

[What the Butler Saw by Joe Orton; Directed by John Tillinger was originally scheduled for the 2013 season but was postponed until the following season.]

2014
Vanya and Sonia and Masha and Spike by Christopher Durang; Directed by Nicholas Martin

The Tallest Tree in the Forest by Daniel Beaty; Directed by Daniel Beaty

Marjorie Prime by Jordan Harrison; Directed by Pam MacKinnon

The Last Confession by Roger Crane (shown at Ahmanson Theatre)

Buyer & Cellar by Jonathan Tolins

What the Butler Saw by Joe Orton; Directed by John Tillinger

2015
The Price by Arthur Miller; Directed by Garry Hynes

Immediate Family by Paul Oakley Stovall; Directed by Phylicia Rashad

Bent by Martin Sherman; Directed by Moisés Kaufman

Appropriate by Branden Jacobs-Jenkins; Directed by Eric Ting

The Christians by Lucas Hnath; Directed by Les Waters

2016
The Beauty Queen of Leenane by Martin McDonagh; Directed by Garry Hynes

Ma Rainey's Black Bottom by August Wilson; Directed by Phylicia Rashad

Disgraced by Ayad Akhtar; Directed by Kimberly Senior

Father Comes Home from the Wars by Suzan-Lori Parks; Directed by Jo Bonney

The Mystery of Love & Sex by Bathsheba Doran; Directed by Robert Egan

2017
Water by the Spoonful by Quiara Alegría Hudes; Directed by Lileana Blain-Cruz

Head of Passes by Tarell Alvin McCraney; Directed by Tina Landau

Heisenberg by Simon Stephens; Directed by Mark Brokaw

Archduke by Rajiv Joseph; Directed by Giovanna Sardelli

Remote L.A. written and directed by Stefan Kaegi and Jörg Karrenbauer

Zoot Suit written and directed by Luis Valdez

2018
Sweat by Lynn Nottage; Directed by Lisa Peterson

Valley of the Heart written and directed by Luis Valdez

Linda Vista by Tracy Letts; Directed by Dexter Bullard

Lackawanna Blues written and directed by Ruben Santiago-Hudson

Happy Days by Samuel Beckett; Directed by James Bundy
 

Theatre in Los Angeles
Theatre company production histories